PSR B0950+08 is a young pulsar that may have come from a supernova that occurred in Leo 1.8 million years ago. The large and old remnant of this supernova, located in the constellation of Antlia, may be the nearest besides the Local Bubble, and the supernova would have been as bright as the moon. Off-pulse emissions from the young pulsar were detected by the Expanded Long Wavelength Array, suggesting the presence of a pulsar wind nebula around it.

External links
The Astrophysical Journal Letters, vol. 576, p. L41, August 2002
New Scientist, August 24, 2002 
 Image PSR B0950+08

References

Pulsars
Leo (constellation)